Thomas Linton "Cowboy" Anderson (July 9, 1910 – September 15, 1971) was a Canadian professional ice hockey defenceman who played eight seasons in the National Hockey League between 1934 and 1942 for the Detroit Red Wings and the New York/Brooklyn Americans. He was born in Edinburgh, Scotland and raised in Drumheller, Alberta and spent his final years in Sylvan Lake, Alberta.

Playing career
Anderson played in the National Hockey League (NHL) from 1934 to 1942. He played his first season for the Detroit Red Wings and his last seven for the New York/Brooklyn Americans.

For the 1941–42 season, Anderson switched positions from left wing to defence. The Americans finished last in the NHL, but Anderson had 41 points to set the league record for a defenceman. He also won the 1942 Hart Trophy as the NHL's most valuable player, becoming the first player to win the award while on a team that missed the playoffs. That was Anderson's last season in the NHL as he enlisted in the Canadian military at the onset of World War II.

He was the last Hart Trophy winner to play for a non-Original Six team until 1973, when Bobby Clarke of the Philadelphia Flyers won the award. Anderson, José Théodore, and Al Rollins are the only winners of the Hart Trophy who have not been selected to the Hockey Hall of Fame.

Career statistics

Regular season and playoffs

See also
List of National Hockey League players born in the United Kingdom

References

External links
 

1910 births
1971 deaths
British emigrants to Canada
Brooklyn Americans players
Canadian expatriate ice hockey players in the United States
Canadian ice hockey coaches
Canadian ice hockey defencemen
Cleveland Barons (1937–1973) players
Detroit Olympics (IHL) players
Detroit Red Wings players
Hart Memorial Trophy winners
Hollywood Wolves players
Ice hockey people from Alberta
New Haven Eagles players
New York Americans players
Oshawa Generals coaches
People from Drumheller
Philadelphia Arrows players
Pittsburgh Hornets coaches
Pittsburgh Hornets players
Providence Reds players